The Prießnitz is a river of Saxony, Germany. It is a right tributary of the Elbe, which it joins in Dresden. For much of its length it flows through the Dresden Heath.

See also
List of rivers of Saxony

Rivers of Saxony
Rivers of Germany